Snæbjörn galti Hólmsteinsson (c. 910 – c. 978) was the first Norseman to intentionally navigate to Greenland, doing so in 978 CE.

His voyage followed the accidental discovery of lands west of Iceland by Gunnbjörn Ulfsson, probably in the early 10th century. According to records from the time, Galte led the first attempt to colonize the eastern coast of Greenland. However his effort ended with disaster and he was killed in internal strife. There had  been a saga about the voyage of Snæbjörn, but it has been lost over time.

Erik the Red would become the first permanent European settler in 982.  According to the Saga of Erik the Red, he spent his three years exploring the west coast of Greenland. Apparently he planned his journey much better and probably was luckier with the weather as well as maintaining better control of his crew.

References

Norwegian explorers
Norse settlements in Greenland
10th-century Icelandic people